The Goonyella railway system is located in Central Queensland, Australia. It services the coal mining area of the Bowen Basin, carrying coal to the Hay Point and Dalrymple Bay Coal Terminals 20 km southeast of Mackay, as well as products to other destinations by way of connections to the North Coast Line at Yukan and the Central Line at Burngrove via the Gregory coal mine branch. It is also connected to the coal loading terminal at Abbot Point (20 km northwest of Bowen) by the GAP line. The line opened on 5 November 1971 and runs for 477 kilometres. A 200 km extension called the Carmichael Rail Network was built in 2021.

The Goonyella system is narrow gauge  and electrified using 25 kV 50 Hz. The line has been duplicated from Hay Point to Wotonga (174 km) and features CTC signalling over the entire system.

Mines
The Goonyella Coal Chain services 25 mines, carrying coal from BHP Mitsubishi Alliance, Anglo Coal, Bravus Mining & Resources, Macarthur Coal, Peabody Energy Australia, Xstrata and ANCI. The system currently operates under a demand-pull model, with rail haulages being designated by the ports, and the shipping stem.

The rail line transports coal from Carmichael coal mine, Gregory Mine, Oaky Creek coal mine, German Creek coal mine, Foxleigh coal mine, Norwich Park coal mine, Lake Vermont Mine, Saraji coal mine, Peak Downs Mine, Millennium Mine, Poitrel Mine, Moorvale Mine, Burton Downs Mine, Carborough Downs Mine, Issac Plains Mine, Moranbah North coal mine, Goonyella Riverside Mine, Hail Creek coal mine, Clermont Mine, Riverside Mine, North Goonyella coal mine, South Walker Creek coal mine, and Blair Athol coal mine.

See also

Rail transport in Queensland

References

External links

 Map of North Queensland Rail Coal Network
 1925 map of the Queensland railway system

Railway lines in Queensland
3 ft 6 in gauge railways in Australia
Xstrata
Railway lines opened in 1971
Buildings and structures in Central Queensland
1971 establishments in Australia